This is a list of bridges and other crossings of the Rio Grande (Río Bravo del Norte), from the Gulf of Mexico, upstream to its source.

Border crossings between the United States and Mexico

Texas–Tamaulipas

Texas–Nuevo León

Texas–Coahuila

Texas–Chihuahua

U.S. domestic crossings

El Paso area

New Mexico

Colorado

References

Geography of the United States
Geography of Mexico

Crossings
Crossings

Rio Grande
Crossings
Crossings
Crossings